SAE J300 is a standard that defines the viscometric properties of mono- and multigrade engine oils, maintained by SAE International. Key parameters for engine oil viscometrics are the oil's kinematic viscosity, its high temperature-high shear viscosity measured by the tapered bearing simulator, and low temperature properties measured by the cold-cranking simulator and mini-rotary viscometer. This standard is commonly used throughout the world, and standards organizations that do so include API and ILSAC, and ACEA.

The SAE has a separate viscosity rating system for gear, axle, and manual transmission oils, SAE J306, which should not be confused with engine oil viscosity. The higher numbers of a gear oil (e.g., 75W-140) does not mean that it has higher viscosity than an engine oil 20W-50.

Single-grade vs. Multi-grade 

For example, a lawnmower may require SAE 30 monograde engine oil that must meet the SAE 30 requirements. However, the temperature range the oil is exposed to in contemporary passenger cars can be wide, ranging from cold temperatures in the winter before the vehicle is started up to hot operating temperatures when the vehicle is fully warmed up in hot summer weather. The difference in viscosities for most single-grade oil is too large between the extremes of temperature, meaning that in cold weather it would be difficult to start the engine as the oil was too thick to crank. To address this issue, manufacturers began adding special polymer additives called viscosity index improvers (VIIs) to the oil. These additives are used to make the oil a multi-grade motor oil, though it is possible to have a multi-grade oil without the use of VIIs. The idea is to cause the multi-grade oil to have the viscosity of the base grade when cold and the viscosity of the second grade when hot. This enables one type of oil to be used all year. In fact, when multi-grades were initially developed, they were frequently described as all-season oil.

The SAE designation for multi-grade oils includes two viscosity grades; for example, 10W-30 designates a common multi-grade oil. Note that both numbers are grades and not viscosity values. The two numbers used are individually defined by SAE J300 for single-grade oils. Therefore, an oil labeled as 10W-30 must pass the SAE J300 viscosity grade requirement for both 10W and 30, and all limitations placed on the viscosity grades (for example, a 10W-30 oil must fail the J300 requirements at 5W). Also, if an oil does not contain any VIIs, and can pass as a multi-grade, that oil can be labeled with a single grade that is either of the two SAE viscosity grades. For example, a very simple multi-grade oil that can be easily made with modern base oils without any VII is a 20W-20. This oil can be labeled as 20W-20, 20W, or 20. If any VIIs are used, however, then that oil cannot be labeled as a single grade.

Grades 

As of 2015 the viscosity grades are 0W, 5W, 10W, 15W, 20W, 25W, 8, 12, 16, 20, 30, 40, 50, and 60. In the United States, these numbers are often referred to as the "weight" of a motor oil, and single-grade motor oils are often called "straight-weight" oils. The grades with a W designation are considered Winter-grades, and denote an engine oil's low-temperature properties, while non-winter grades denote an engine oil's properties at the operating temperature of an engine. In anticipation of new lower engine oil viscosity grades, to avoid confusion with the "winter" grades of oil the SAE adopted 16 as the grade below 20 instead of 15. Regarding the change Michael Covitch of Lubrizol, Chair of the SAE International Engine Oil Viscosity Classification (EOVC) task force was quoted stating "If we continued to count down from SAE 20 to 15 to 10, etc., we would be facing continuing customer confusion problems with popular low-temperature viscosity grades such as SAE 10W, SAE 5W, and SAE 0W," he noted. "By choosing to call the new viscosity grade SAE 16, we established a precedent for future grades, counting down by fours instead of fives: SAE 12, SAE 8, SAE 4." The SAE 8 through SAE 16 viscosity grades describe oils that can improve fuel economy through reduced hydrodynamic friction.

To assign winter grades, the dynamic viscosity is measured at various cold temperatures, specified in J300, in units of mPa·s, or the equivalent older non-SI units, centipoise (abbreviated cP), using two test methods. They are the cold-cranking simulator (CCS, ASTM D5293) and the mini-rotary viscometer (pumping, ASTM D4684). Each temperature is associated with a grade, SAE 0W, 5W, 10W, 15W, 20W, or 25W, with higher grade numbers corresponding to higher temperatures.  The oil fails the test at a particular temperature if the oil is too viscous.  The grade of the oil is that associated with the coldest temperature at which the oil passes the test.  For example, if an oil passes at the specified temperatures for 10W and 5W, but fails at the 0W temperature, the oil is grade 5W.  It cannot be labeled 0W or 10W.

The longer it takes, the higher the viscosity and thus the higher the SAE code. Larger numbers are thicker. J300 specifies a viscosity range for each non-winter grade, with higher grade numbers corresponding to higher viscosities. In addition, a minimum viscosity measured at a high temperature and high-shear rate (HTHS, ASTM D4683) is also required.

References

Further reading
 

Lubrication
Viscosity
Motor oils
Automotive standards